Valley Railroad Stone Bridge is a historic stone arch bridge spanning Folly Mills Creek near Jolivue, Augusta County, Virginia. It is constructed of granite and faced in ashlar and features semi-circular arches set on gently splayed piers. It was acquired by the Virginia Department of Transportation in 1965. It is considered a scenic landmark along Interstate 81.

It was listed on the National Register of Historic Places in 1974.

See also
List of bridges documented by the Historic American Engineering Record in Virginia
List of bridges on the National Register of Historic Places in Virginia
Valley Railroad Bridge

References

External links

Historic American Engineering Record in Virginia
Railroad bridges in Virginia
Railroad bridges on the National Register of Historic Places in Virginia
Bridges completed in 1882
Buildings and structures in Augusta County, Virginia
National Register of Historic Places in Augusta County, Virginia
Stone arch bridges in the United States
1882 establishments in Virginia